Buffers Evolution is a Japan-only game for the WonderSwan by Bandai.

References

1999 video games
Japan-exclusive video games
WonderSwan games
Platform games
Bandai games
Video games developed in Japan